Deadly Hero is a 1975 American neo noir thriller film starring Don Murray, Diahn Williams, James Earl Jones, Lilia Skala and Treat Williams (in his film debut). It was directed by Ivan Nagy from a screenplay by George Wislocki and Don Petersen. Released in limited locales in 1975 with an R rating from the Motion Picture Association of America, it was distributed by AVCO Embassy. It opened to mixed, mostly negative reviews, and was considered a commercial failure.

Plot
Officer Lacy is an 18-year veteran of the New York City Police Department who finds himself demoted from detective back to patrol duty for his violent, racist tendencies and trigger-happy behavior. He still has friends on the job and is ingratiating himself as a booster for a politician named Reilly who is looking to become Mayor of the city. Responding to a call on Manhattan's West Side, he finds a young musician named Sally has been abducted by a mugger named Rabbit. Rabbit holds Sally hostage and scares her badly but doesn't actually hurt her physically. When her neighbor figures out something is wrong and calls the cops, Officer Lacy shows up and finds Rabbit holding Sally at knifepoint in the hallway. Rabbit quickly surrenders when Lacy threatens to shoot him, but during the arrest Lacy hits Rabbit and then angrily shoots him twice in the chest, killing him. Lacy asks Sally to lie to the detectives that Rabbit was holding the knife when he was shot, and she agrees to this. Lacy becomes a city hero and Reilly makes him a key part of his campaign. However, Sally feels guilty about lying and eventually tells the detectives that Lacy killed Rabbit while he was unarmed and had surrendered. Lacy tries to charm Sally into reverting fully into her original story, but she refuses. Lacy then becomes a public pariah and is forced to go on unpaid suspension, while Reilly cuts all ties with him. Lacy then becomes unhinged, threatening Sally directly and having a sleazy ex-cop "scare" her in a bungled plot that leaves two civilians dead. With nothing left to lose, Lacy kills the ex-cop and then tracks Sally down to the Manhattan school where she works and kidnaps her and takes her out of the city to a pet graveyard. He ties her up and plans to shoot and bury her in the graveyard but she gets loose and severely wounds him, getting away into a forest. Lacy runs after her and the final shot of the movie shows him either dead and holding his gun in a failed attempt to kill her when she's in his sights, or about to die but ready to shoot and kill her before he does die. The film then ends without a resolution.

Cast
Don Murray ... Lacy
 Diahn Williams ... Sally
James Earl Jones ... Rabbit
Lilia Skala ... Mrs. Broderick
Conchata Ferrell ... Slugger Ann
George S. Irving ... Reilly
 Ron Weyand ... Captain Stark
Treat Williams ... Billings
Hank Garrett ... Buckley
Dick Anthony Williams ... D. A. Winston

The cast also includes performances by Josh Mostel as "Victor", Rutanya Alda as "Apple Mary", Charles Siebert as "Baker", plus Beverly Johnson, Chu Chu Malave, Danny DeVito, and an uncredited Deborah Harry, lead singer from the city's punk/new wave-ers Blondie as a singer. Deadly Hero is Treat Williams' first motion picture appearance.

Production info
Deadly Hero was directed by Ivan Nagy from a screenplay by George Wislocki and Don Petersen. The film was produced by Thomas J. McGrath and distributed by AVCO Embassy Pictures. The film's cinematographer was Andrzej Bartkowiak, with editing by Susan Steinberg, music by Brad Fiedel and Tommy Mandel, and art direction by Alan Herman.  Deadly Hero was filmed entirely on location in New York City. The 102-minute film was released as R-rated (Restricted) from the Motion Picture Association of America.

Reception

Critical reaction
Gene Siskel wrote in the Chicago Tribune that the film is "a small triumph" but qualifying that praise by noting, "Of course, expecting nothing helps." A reviewer for the Cineman Syndicate felt that "moments of suspense" helped elevate the "thin script and moody photography". A.H. Weiler of The New York Times described Deadly Hero as a "fairly derivative Manhattan melodrama" with the supporting cast "wasted in brief, broad portrayals". Los Angeles Times reviewer Linda Gross called the film "gritty" and "intriguing" but ultimately found it "predictable and pessimistic". Modern critics have been kinder with VideoHound's Golden Movie Retriever describing it as both "gripping" and "chilling" while rating the film three (out of a possible four) bones.

Popular reaction
A commercial failure, George Anderson wrote in the Pittsburgh Post-Gazette that the violent film "suffered sudden death at the box office."

Home media
Deadly Hero was released on VHS in the 1980s by Magnetic Video and in 1986 by Embassy Home Entertainment. The film was released on DVD on August 7, 2007, by Trinity Home Entertainment.  On December 22, 2015, it was released on Blu-ray by Code Red Entertainment through Screen Archives Entertainment Exclusive.

References

External links 
 
 
 
 

1975 films
1970s crime drama films
1970s crime thriller films
American crime drama films
American crime thriller films
Fictional portrayals of the New York City Police Department
Films about the New York City Police Department
Films directed by Ivan Nagy
Films set in New York City
Films shot in New York City
American neo-noir films
Films scored by Brad Fiedel
Embassy Pictures films
1975 drama films
1970s English-language films
1970s American films